Tommaso Riccardi (24 June 1844 – 25 March 1915) was an Italian Roman Catholic priest who was a professed member of the Benedictines of the Cassinese Congregation. He took the name of Placidio after admittance.

He was beatified in 1954 after the approval of two miracles attributed to his intercession.

Life
Tommaso Riccardi was born in Trevi on 24 June 1844 and spent his childhood in Umbria. He moved to Rome in 1865 in order to commence his studies for the priesthood.

He underwent philosophical studies under the Dominicans at the Collegio Angelico, the future Pontifical University of Saint Thomas Aquinas, Angelicum in Rome. This led to a pilgrimage to Loreto and his entrance to the Cassinese Congregation of the Order of Saint Benedict on 12 November 1866. He made his final profession in 1868 and assumed the name of "Placido".

As a deacon on 5 November 1870 he was arrested due to the fact that he dodged conscription and he was imprisoned in Florence and then sent as a soldier in Livorno after his release from prison on 24 December 1870. After that debacle he returned to Rome to resume his studies. He was ordained to the priesthood on 25 March 1871. His students included the future cardinal Alfredo Ildefonso Schuster.

He contracted malaria in 1881 and suffered from that disease for the rest of his life. He served as a spiritual director in Perugia from 1882 and served as a rector to the Benedictines in Rome in 1887. He served as the rector of the Basilica of Santa Maria di Farfa in Rome in 1894 and lived in hermitage near San Fiano. He served as a confessor to a convent of Poor Clares he lived near.

He died on 25 March 1915 in Rome at the church of San Paolo fuori le Mura.

Beatification
The beatification process commenced in Rome on 3 March 1935 under Pope Pius XI and the two local process ensured. It granted him the title of Servant of God. Both processes were ratified on 20 November 1940.

The recognition of his life of heroic virtue on 4 June 1944 allowed Pope Pius XII to confer upon him the title of Venerable. Pius XII also approved two miracles attributed to his intercession and beatified him on 5 December 1954.

References

External links
Hagiography Circle
Saints SQPN

1844 births
1915 deaths
19th-century venerated Christians
20th-century venerated Christians
Benedictines
19th-century Italian Roman Catholic priests
Italian beatified people